Unleashed is the official debut album of Scottish Celtic rock band Wolfstone. It was released in 1991.

Track listing
 "Cleveland Park" - 4:16
Cleveland Park
The Banks of the Allan
Kenny Gillies of Portnalong, Skye
 "Song for Yesterday" - 5:25
 "The Silver Spear" - 3:54
Paddy Fehey's
The Silver Spear
 "Sleepy Toon" - 3:52
 "Hector the Hero" - 5:08
 "The Howl" - 7:31
The Louis Reel
Morrison's Jig
The Shoe Polisher's Jig
 "Here Is Where the Heart Is" - 5:14
Lily the Pict
Here Is Where the Heart Is
 "Hard Heart" - 5:44
 "Erin" - 5:45
The Coast of Austria
Toss the Feathers
Farewell to Erin
Captain Lachlan MacPhail of Tiree

Preview
A preview containing both re-recordings of earlier tracks and samples from the album was issued before its release in 1991, entitled Unleashed: The Preview.

Track listing
"Erin"
"Song for Yesterday"
"Ready for the Storm"
"A Stoir Moi Chroi"

Personnel
Duncan Chisholm: fiddle
Stuart Eaglesham: acoustic guitar, electric guitar
Struan Eaglesham: keyboards
Ivan Drever: acoustic guitar, lead vocals
Andy Murray: electric guitar, vocals
Allan Wilson: pipes, whistle, flute
Neil Hay: bass guitar
John Henderson: drums

Wolfstone albums
1991 albums
1991 EPs